"I'll Follow the Sun" is a song by German Eurodance group Mr. President, released in March 1995 as the second single from their first album, Up'n Away - The Album (1995). It was the first single to receive participation from rapper Delroy "Layzee Dee" Rennalls, after George "Sir Prophet" Jones left the group. A moderate success on the charts in Europe, it peaked at number 15 in Finland, number 16 in Switzerland, number 18 in Austria and number 23 in Germany. On the Eurochart Hot 100, the song reached number 58 in March 1995.

Critical reception
Pan-European magazine Music & Media wrote, "When the Euro president pushes the red button, you'll hear a big bang which clatters like a speeded up bassline from Jacko's "Billy Jean" with souped-up Giorgio Moroder computer disco."

Music video
The accompanying music video for "I'll Follow the Sun" was directed by Czar.

Track listing
 CD maxi, Germany (1995)
"I'll Follow the Sun" (Radio Edit) – 3:23
"I'll Follow the Sun" (Extended Version) – 5:36
"I'll Follow the Sun" (Discotheque Version) – 5:36
"Up'n Away" (Mix Version) – 5:42

 CD maxi - Remixes, Germany (1995)
"I'll Follow the Sun" (Peter Parker Dub Mix) – 6:13
"I'll Follow the Sun" (Peter Parker Compact Mix) – 5:40
"I'll Follow the Sun" (DJ Perplexer Remix) – 4:43

Charts

References

 

1995 singles
1995 songs
English-language German songs
Mr. President (band) songs
Music videos directed by Czar (director)
Warner Records singles